The 2018 Men's Hockey World Cup Final was a field hockey match played between Belgium and the Netherlands on 16 December 2018 at the Kalinga Stadium in Bhubaneswar, India.

Belgium won their first World Cup after defeating the Netherlands in the Final in penalty shoot-out. This was also Belgium's first ever world title in a team sport. Belgian goalkeeper Vincent Vanasch was named player of the match in the Final.

Route to the final

Belgium
Belgium entered the World Cup as one of the favorites and ranked third in the FIH World Rankings. They had enjoyed success in major tournaments in the preceding years, winning silver medals at the 2016 Summer Olympics and the 2017 EuroHockey Nations Championship.

At the World Cup, Belgium were drawn in Pool C alongside Canada, hosts India and South Africa. Belgium began the tournament with a 2–1 win over Canada through field goals by Félix Denayer and Thomas Briels. In their second pool match, they secured a 2–2 draw against India with a 56th minute equalizer by Simon Gougnard. They came back from behind in their final group match against South Africa to post a 5–1 victory through goals by Alexander Hendrickx, Gougnard, Loïck Luypaert and Cédric Charlier. They finished second in the group with seven points, as India, who finished on the same number of points, had a better goal difference.

Belgium defeated Pakistan 5–0 in the cross-over with Hendrickx, Briels, Charlier, Sébastien Dockier and Tom Boon scoring. In the quarterfinal against Germany, Belgium came back from being 0–1 down after the first quarter to winning 2–1, with an 18th minute goal by Hendrickx from a penalty corner and a field goal by Boon in the 50th minute. They faced England in the semifinal who had knocked out Olympic gold medalists and second-ranked team in the world Argentina in the quarterfinal. Belgium dominated the semifinal, shutting out England 6–0 as Boon, Gougnard, Charlier, Hendrickx and Dockier scored for the Red Lions. Belgium thus entered their first ever World Cup final.

Netherlands
Ranked fourth in the world, the Netherlands were tipped prior to the World Cup as one of the contenders to win the tournament. The Dutch had finished runners-up at the 2014 World Cup and won the 2017 EuroHockey Nations Championship.

The Netherlands were placed in Pool D with Germany, Malaysia and Pakistan. They recorded a 7–0 win over Malaysia in the opening match, with the help of Jeroen Hertzberger's hat-trick. In the second game, the Dutch were leading Germany 1–0 until the 30th minute, before Germans scored four times, including thrice in the last quarter, to beat the Dutch 4–1. The Netherlands defeated Pakistan 5–1 in their final pool match, with goals from Thierry Brinkman, Valentin Verga, Bob de Voogd, Jorrit Croon and Mink van der Weerden.

The Dutch cruised into the quarterfinals with a 5–0 win over Canada in the cross-over. Facing the home team India in the quarterfinal, the Netherlands conceded a goal in the 12th minute but equalized three minutes later with a Brinkman field goal. Defender van der Weerden converted a penalty corner in the fourth quarter to seal a 2–1 victory for his team. The Dutch faced defending champions and world number one Australia in the semifinal. The Dutch took an early lead in the match as Glenn Schuurman netted one in the ninth minute and Seve van Ass doubled the lead with a goal in the second quarter. Australia pulled one goal back in the final minute of the third quarter before scoring the equalizer in the final minute of the fourth to push the game into penalty shoot-out. The Netherlands won the shootout 4–3 in sudden death, after the teams were level 3–3 from five strokes each.

Match

Summary

Belgium began the first quarter with Simon Gougnard having a shot at the goal in the second minute but the ball went just wide. Six minutes later Dutchman Jeroen Hertzberger successfully entered the Belgian circle, creating the first chance for his team, but shot well wide of the goal. The quarter ended with the game "evenly poised" as Belgium marginally led possession at 51%. Belgium continued to attack at the start of the second quarter but were intercepted twice in the 18th minute by Mirco Pruyser and Hertzberger. In the 26th minute, Thierry Brinkman stopped an attack by Belgian forward Cedric Charlier in the circle. The Dutch then pressed forward and won the first penalty corner of the match in the 28th minute but Hertzberger's shot was deflected away by Florent van Aubel. A minute later Belgium lost their referral after an unsuccessful appeal against a penalty corner that was awarded to the Netherlands. However, Mink van der Weerden was fouled for swinging his stick too high as another chance for the Dutch went in vain.

Two minutes into the second half, Dutch goalkeeper Pirmin Blaak made a diving save at a Thomas Briels' shot. Sebastien Dockier then took a shot in the 39th minute but it went wide across the goalpost. Belgian goalkeeper Vincent Vanasch made a comfortable save in the 49th minute, before a tackle by Nicolas De Kerpel in the circle denied the Dutch a chance at having another shot at the goal. Dutch midfielder Jonas de Geus picked up a green card in the 57th minute, leaving the Netherlands down to ten players for the subsequent two minutes. Neither team could break the 0–0 deadlock before the full time hooter and the match entered the penalty shoot-out stage.

The Dutch started well in the penalty shoot-out, securing a 2–1 lead after three shots each. After Seve van Ass missed the fourth try for the Netherlands, Belgium equalized through Victor Wegnez. Thijs van Dam failed to score for the Netherlands in their final shot thanks to a tackle by Vanasch. Belgium then had their goal overturned off their fifth try, as Blaak used the video referral upon noticing that the ball had bounced off Arthur De Sloover's foot just before the shot. With the score still tied at 2–2, the match headed to sudden death penalty shoot-out.

Belgium went first in the sudden death and scored through van Aubel. The Netherlands used their referral again appealing for obstruction but the video umpire ruled in favor of Belgium. Hertzberger, needing to score to keep the Netherlands alive, was forced wide by Vanasch and missed his shot, giving Belgium a 3–2 victory and their maiden World Cup title.

Details

Aftermath
Vanasch won the player of the match for his four saves in the penalty shoot-out. Defender Arthur van Doren was named the player of the tournament. At the conclusion of the match, Belgium displaced Australia as the top-ranked men's team in the FIH World Rankings, while the Netherlands moved up one place to third.

On 18 December, the Belgian team was welcomed home by thousands of fans at the Grand-Place in Brussels. Among those who were present at the celebrations were Queen Mathilde and King Philippe.

References

Final
2018
2018 in Belgian sport
2018 in Dutch sport
2018 in Indian sport